Lamoine is a town in Hancock County, Maine, United States. The town was named after an early resident, Andre LeMoyne. The spelling shifted slightly over the years. "Le moine" is French for "the monk." The population was 1,720 at the 2020 census.

Geography

Demographics

2010 census

As of the census of 2010, there were 1,602 people, 712 households, and 460 families living in the town. The racial makeup of the town was 98.0% White, 0.5% African American, 0.1% Native American, 0.5% Asian, 0.1% from other races, and 0.8% from two or more races. Hispanic or Latino of any race were 0.7% of the population.

There were 712 households, of which 24.4% had children under the age of 18 living with them, 54.1% were married couples living together, 6.3% had a female householder with no husband present, 4.2% had a male householder with no wife present, and 35.4% were non-families. 25.0% of all households were made up of individuals, and 8.1% had someone living alone who was 65 years of age or older. The average household size was 2.25 and the average family size was 2.68.

The median age in the town was 48 years. 17.9% of residents were under the age of 18; 4.8% were between the ages of 18 and 24; 22.2% were from 25 to 44; 37.9% were from 45 to 64; and 17.4% were 65 years of age or older. The gender makeup of the town was 48.8% male and 51.2% female.

2000 census

As of the census of 2000, there were 1,495 people, 605 households, and 434 families living in the town. The racial makeup of the town was 97.53% White, 0.27% African American, 0.54% Native American, 0.67% Asian, 0.07% from other races, and 0.94% from two or more races. Hispanic or Latino of any race were 0.60% of the population.

There were 605 households, out of which 31.2% had children under the age of 18 living with them, 61.2% were married couples living together, 6.8% had a female householder with no husband present, and 28.1% were non-families. 21.2% of all households were made up of individuals, and 8.4% had someone living alone who was 65 years of age or older.  The average household size was 2.47 and the average family size was 2.86.

In the town, the population was spread out, with 23.7% under the age of 18, 5.0% from 18 to 24, 28.9% from 25 to 44, 28.0% from 45 to 64, and 14.4% who were 65 years of age or older.  The median age was 41 years. For every 100 females, there were 95.7 males.  For every 100 females age 18 and over, there were 93.4 males.

The median income for a household in the town was $39,783, and the median income for a family was $45,050. Males had a median income of $28,365 versus $22,300 for females. The per capita income for the town was $19,712.  About 5.3% of families and 8.8% of the population were below the poverty line, including 13.8% of those under age 18 and 5.4% of those age 65 or over.

Government

The Town of Lamoine elects a five-member Board of Selectmen who serve as the municipal officers of the municipality. They employ a full-time administrative assistant, a full-time Town Clerk, Tax Collector, part-time Code Enforcement Officer and Transfer Station Manager. The Board of Assessors is an elected three member body. The Lamoine School Department is a 5-member elected board which employs a part-time superintendent of schools and is responsible for operation of the Lamoine Consolidated School.

Most municipal meetings are held at the Lamoine Town Hall, 606 Douglas Highway, Lamoine.

Known for views of Frenchman Bay and Mt. Desert Island, Lamoine is a bedroom community to Ellsworth and Bar Harbor with an active gravel mining industry. There are a couple of small boat building operations in town and a general store.

References

External links
Town website

Towns in Hancock County, Maine
Towns in Maine
Populated coastal places in Maine